Payas Belediyespor 2011 Men Volleyball is the men volleyball section of Payas Belediyespor, a major sports club in Hatay, Turkey.

League Performances

References 

Turkish volleyball clubs